One in a Million: The Ron LeFlore Story (also known as Man of Passion) is a 1978 American made-for-television biographical sports drama film telling the story of Ron LeFlore, a troubled Detroit youth who rose from Michigan prisons to star in Major League Baseball with the Detroit Tigers. The film was based on LeFlore's autobiography, Breakout: From Prison to the Big Leagues.

Plot 
The film follows LeFlore from his heroin addiction, to his time in Michigan's Jackson State Penitentiary, and tells of his discovery in prison by Billy Martin, who was then the manager of the Detroit Tigers.  The role of Ron LeFlore was played by LeVar Burton.  Larry B. Scott portrayed Ron LeFlore's younger brother.

Former Detroit manager Billy Martin played himself, and former Tiger players Norm Cash, Bill Freehan, Al Kaline, and Jim Northrup also appeared as themselves.

The movie first aired on CBS on September 26, 1978 and was released theatrically in Europe.

Cast 
LeVar Burton as Ron LeFlore
Madge Sinclair as Georgia LeFlore
Paul Benjamin as John LeFlore
James Luisi as Jimmy Karalla
Billy Martin as Himself
Zakes Mokae as Pee Wee Spencer
Larry B. Scott as Gerald LeFlore
Anthony Mockus Sr. as Board Chairman

References

External links 

1978 television films
1978 films
1970s biographical films
1970s sports films
1970s biographical drama films
Biographical films about sportspeople
Cultural depictions of baseball players
Cultural depictions of American men
American biographical films
American biographical drama films
American baseball films
Detroit Tigers
Sports films based on actual events
CBS network films
Films directed by William Graham (director)
Black people in art
Films set in Michigan
1970s English-language films
American drama television films
1970s American films